The 1992 United Kingdom general election in Northern Ireland was held on 9 April with 17 MPs elected in single-seat constituencies using first-past-the-post as part of the wider general election in the United Kingdom. 1,124,900 people were eligible to vote, up 34,511 from the 1987 general election. 70.02% of eligible voters turned out, down 2.6 percentage points from the last general election.

Results
The Conservative Party, now led by John Major as prime minister, won another term in government. In Northern Ireland, the only change was between the nationalist parties, with Sinn Féin losing its seat in Belfast West to the SDLP. The SDLP's four seats was and still is its best-ever result.

MPs elected

By-elections

References

Northern Ireland
1983
1992 elections in Northern Ireland